Interstate 44 (I-44) is a major Interstate Highway in the central United States. Although it is nominally an east–west road as it is even-numbered, it follows a more southwest–northeast alignment. Its western terminus is in Wichita Falls, Texas, at a concurrency with U.S. Route 277 (US 277), US 281, and US 287; its eastern terminus is at I-70 in St. Louis, Missouri. I-44 is one of five Interstates built to bypass US 66; this highway covers the section between Oklahoma City and St. Louis. Virtually the entire length of I-44 east of Springfield, Missouri, was once US 66, which was upgraded from two to four lanes from 1949 to 1955. The section of I-44 west of Springfield was built farther south than US 66 in order to connect Missouri's section with the already completed Will Rogers Turnpike, which Oklahoma wished to carry their part of I-44.

Route description

|-
|TX
|
|-
|OK
|
|-
|MO
|
|-
|Total
|
|}

Texas

In the US state of Texas, I-44 has a short, but regionally important,  stretch, connecting Wichita Falls with Oklahoma. The route runs almost due north to the Texas–Oklahoma state line at the Red River. In Wichita Falls, I-44 runs concurrently with US 277, US 281, and US 287 and is known locally as the "Central Freeway". There are plans to extend I-44 to Abilene, Texas, to connect I-44 to the I-20/I-10 corridor. I-44 provides access to downtown Wichita Falls and Sheppard Air Force Base.

Oklahoma

I-44 in Oklahoma is mostly three separate toll roads; it is paralleled by former US 66 from Oklahoma City to the Missouri state line. In southwestern Oklahoma, I-44 is the H. E. Bailey Turnpike and is mainly north–south. From Oklahoma City, I-44 runs northeast–southwest as the Turner Turnpike towards Tulsa. After I-44 leaves Tulsa, it becomes the Will Rogers Turnpike to the Missouri state line.

Missouri

I-44 enters Missouri southwest of Joplin near the tripoint of Oklahoma, Missouri, and Kansas. The first exit in Missouri is for US 166. I-44 continues through the southern part of Joplin, where it runs concurrently with the new Missouri segment of I-49. East of Joplin, I-49 splits off on its own alignment to Kansas City.

I-44 then continues east on the former US 166 to Mount Vernon. At the northeast part of Mount Vernon, I-44 heads northeast, while old US 166 continued east on Route 174. The section of road to Halltown is a completely new road, not bypassing any previous highways. At Halltown, the road follows the general pathway of US 66 all the way to downtown St. Louis.

I-44 passes through Springfield on the north side of the city and continues northeast. At Waynesville, I-44 enters a very hilly and curvy area until it passes Rolla. Although the road still passes through some hilly areas, none are as steep as that particular stretch.

At Pacific, I-44 widens to six lanes, later to eight lanes. The Interstate passes through the suburbs of St. Louis and then into downtown St. Louis, passing the Gateway Arch before finally terminating near the Mississippi River, continuing from there as I-70 from the west end of the Stan Musial Veterans Memorial Bridge. Until a future second span of the new bridge is completed, there will be no way for I-44 traffic to utilize the new Stan Musial Veterans Memorial span without first exiting to surface streets. I-44 traffic wishing to continue northeast and east must use the Poplar Street Bridge and I-55/I-64 to cross the Mississippi River.

At some places, an "Alternate I-44" is posted. One such ran between Rolla and Springfield via US 60 and US 63, and another ran via US 63 and US 50 between Rolla and Union. These were completed to provide traffic relief during road work. The latter of these alternate routes detoured traffic around three-hour delays due to road work near Cuba.

History
I-44 was originally signed in 1958 as an Interstate designation of the Turner Turnpike linking Oklahoma City and Tulsa and the Will Rogers Turnpike linking Tulsa and the Missouri state line southwest of Joplin, along with the US 66 bypass in Tulsa that linked that city with the two turnpikes and the continued four-lane highway from the Missouri border to an interchange with US 71 south of Joplin previously designated as US 166.

As US 66 was being bypassed by I-44, the Route 66 Association requested the designation Interstate 66 for I-44 from St. Louis to Oklahoma City; The American Association of State Highway and Transportation Officials (AASHTO) rejected the request.

At the time the I-44 designation was assigned in Oklahoma in the 1950s, Oklahoma signed the milemarkers west to east starting at Turner Turnpike's Oklahoma City terminus at the I-44/I-35 interchange (near Edmond). I-44 was extended in 1982 southwest of Oklahoma City along the existing H. E. Bailey Turnpike, thus raising the milemarkers by about 100. The addition of the new section was unusual in that it is a more north–south segment and did not directly connect to the previous western end at I-35. It now extends south of I-40, an exception to the Interstate numbering rules and its end point does not connect to another Interstate Highway.

What was once I-244 around St. Louis is currently part of that city's I-270/I-255 beltway.

During the historic 1999 Oklahoma tornado outbreak, an F5 tornado crossed I-44. This particular tornado had the fastest tornado wind speeds on record. The interstate was severely damaged where the tornado crossed it. In the end, this tornado was blamed for 36 deaths.

A section of I-44 was moved slightly north between Powellville and Doolittle, Missouri. The old road is highly visible for eastbound traffic near Powellville. , the rocks carved away for the new roadbed have virtually no lichen, reflecting that this construction occurred rather recently.

Originally, the eastern terminus of I-44 was at the intersection with I-55, I-64, I-70, and US 40, by the Poplar Street Bridge.

Junction list
Texas
  in Wichita Falls. I-44/US 287 travels concurrently through Wichita Falls. I-44/US 277/US 281 travels concurrently to west-southwest of Randlett, Oklahoma.
Oklahoma
  west of Randlett
  in Walters
  northwest of Geronimo. The highways travel concurrently to east of Medicine Park.
  in Lawton. The highways travel concurrently to east of Medicine Park.
  in Elgin
  in Chickasha
  in Chickasha
  in Newcastle. I-44/US 62 travels concurrently to Oklahoma City.
  in Oklahoma City
  in Oklahoma City
  in Oklahoma City
  in Oklahoma City. The highways travel concurrently through northeast Oklahoma City.
  in Stroud
  on the Sapulpa–Oakhurst line
  in Tulsa
  in Tulsa
  in Tulsa
  in Tulsa. I-44/US 412 travels concurrently to the Tulsa–Fair Oaks line
  in Big Cabin
  in Vinita
  northeast of Afton
Missouri
  west-northwest of Loma Linda
  south-southwest of Duenweg. The highways travel concurrently to Fidelity.
  in Springfield
  in Springfield
  in Rolla
  south-southwest of Villa Ridge. The highways travel concurrently to the Sunset Hills–Kirkwood city line.
  in Sunset Hills
  on the Sunset Hills–Kirkwood city line
  in St. Louis. The highways travel concurrently through St. Louis
  in St. Louis
  in St. Louis

Auxiliary routes
I-44 has two auxiliary routes. In Tulsa, Oklahoma, there is an I-244 and an unsigned I-444. There was also another auxiliary route located in St. Louis, Missouri, but was decommissioned in 1974. It is now signed as I-270.

Business routes

All business loops of I-44 are located in Missouri. They serve Joplin, Sarcoxie, Mount Vernon, Springfield, Lebanon, Waynesville–St. Robert, Rolla, and Pacific. A business spur links I-44 with Fort Leonard Wood.

See also

References

External links

 
 Interstate 44 on Interstate-guide.com

 
44
044
Roads in Greater St. Louis